is a Japanese footballer who plays for FC Osaka.

Career
After attending Kindai University, Tanaka signed in 2015 with FC Osaka. After three years with the Kansai-based side, he opted to move to Azul Claro Numazu for 2018 season.

Club statistics
Updated to 31 December 2020.

Honours
 Blaublitz Akita
 J3 League (1): 2020

References

External links

Profile at FC Osaka
Profile at Azul Claro Numazu
Profile at Akita

1993 births
Living people
Kindai University alumni
Association football people from Osaka Prefecture
People from Hannan, Osaka
Japanese footballers
J3 League players
Japan Football League players
FC Osaka players
Azul Claro Numazu players
Blaublitz Akita players
Association football forwards